3 Camelopardalis is a spectroscopic and visual binary in the constellation Camelopardalis.  It is approximately 496 light years from Earth.

3 Camelopardalis is a visual binary with the two components separated by 3.7".  The brighter of the pair is also a single-lined spectroscopic binary with an orbital period of 121 days.

The primary component, 3 Camelopardalis Aa, is an orange K-type giant with a mean apparent magnitude of +5.07.  It rotates once every 121 days, matching the orbital period with its close companion.  It was thought to be a short period Cepheid variable when it was first investigated, but has since been classified as a probable RS Canum Venaticorum variable.  The total amplitude of its variations is less than 0.1 magnitudes.

The spectroscopic companion has not been observed directly and its cannot be detected in the spectrum. It is inferred on the basis of radial velocity variations in its brighter companion.

The visual companion is a 12th magnitude star.

References

External links
 HR 1467
 CCDM J04399+5305
 Image 3 Camelopardalis

Camelopardalis, 03
Camelopardalis (constellation)
RS Canum Venaticorum variables
K-type giants
Spectroscopic binaries
029317
021727
1467
Durchmusterung objects
Suspected variables